are zigzag-shaped paper streamers, often seen attached to  or , and used in Shinto rituals in Japan. The wand is waved at a slow and rhythmic pace, but with a little force so that the  strips make a rustling noise on each pass of the wand.

The  has been used for centuries in Shinto ceremonies and has similarities in Ainu culture.

References

External links
 

Origami
Shinto in Japan
Shinto religious objects
Exorcism in Shinto